Terang railway station is located on the Warrnambool line in Victoria, Australia. It serves the town of Terang, and it opened on 23 April 1887.

History

Terang opened as the terminus of the line from Camperdown. On 4 February 1890, the line was extended to Warrnambool. During the first year of operation, the station sold 11,510 tickets to Camperdown, for a total revenue of £11,157. At the peak of operations, the station had a four road yard. Today, it has a single dead end siding.

The station was once the junction for the Mortlake line. It opened in 1890, and closed on 1 August 1978.

The building itself consists of a single level. Notable features include round arched windows, tall octagonal chimney stacks, cream brick dressings and a gambrel roof to the porch. The station represents an intact example of a station building design stemming from the Victorian Government Railway Construction Act 1884. As a result, the station is heritage listed and holds a historical significance to south-west Victoria.

A number of track alterations took place at the station in 1982, including the removal of No. 4 road, the dock road and a dead end extension of No. 2 road.

In 2007, points at the Down end of the station were abolished, and was replaced with a straight section of track. This effectively left Terang straight-railed.

As part of the Regional Rail Revival project, a passing lane is to be constructed at Boorcan, located between Terang and Camperdown stations, to allow an increase of passenger services on the line. The project is due to be completed in mid-2022.

Platforms and services

Terang has one platform. It is serviced by V/Line Warrnambool line services.

Platform 1:
  services to Warrnambool and Southern Cross

References

External links
 Victorian Railway Stations gallery

Railway stations in Australia opened in 1887
Regional railway stations in Victoria (Australia)
Victorian Heritage Register
Listed railway stations in Australia
Shire of Corangamite